Robin Berjon is a French computer scientist and political writer. He is the editor of the W3C HTML5 specification. In 2012 he was elected to the W3C Technical Architecture Group (TAG) but he had to resign early in 2013.

References

External links
 
 Profile - W3C

Living people
French computer scientists
French political writers
World Wide Web Consortium
Scientists from Paris
XML Guild
1977 births
French male non-fiction writers